The term child actor or child actress is generally applied to a child acting on stage or in movies or television. An adult who began their acting career as a child may also be called a child actor, or a "former child actor". Closely associated terms include teenage actor or teen actor, an actor who reached popularity as a teenager.

Famous earlier examples include Elizabeth Taylor, who started as a child star in the early 1940s in productions like National Velvet before becoming a popular film star as an adult in movies.

Many child actors find themselves struggling to adapt as they become adults, mainly due to typecasting. Macaulay Culkin and Lindsay Lohan are two particular famous child actors who eventually experienced much difficulty with the fame they acquired at a young age. Some child actors do go on to have successful acting careers as adults; notable actors who first gained fame as children include Mickey Rooney, Kurt Russell, Jodie Foster, Christian Bale, Elijah Wood, Natalie Portman, and Scarlett Johansson. Other child actors have gone on to successful careers in other fields, including director Ron Howard, politicians Lech and Jarosław Kaczyński, and singer Jenny Lewis.

Regulation
In the United States, the activities of child actors are regulated by the governing labor union, if any, and state laws. Some projects film in distant locations specifically to evade regulations intended to protect the child. Longer work hours or risky stunts prohibited by California, for example, might be permitted to a project filming in British Columbia. US federal law "specifically exempted minors working in the Entertainment Business from all provisions of the Child Labor Laws." Any regulation of child actors is governed by disparate state laws.

California
Due to the large presence of the entertainment industry in Hollywood, the state of California has some of the most explicit laws protecting child actors. Being a minor, a child actor must secure an entertainment work permit before accepting any paid work. Compulsory education laws mandate that the education of the child actor not be disrupted while the child is working, whether the child actor is enrolled in public school, private school or even home school. The child does their schoolwork under the supervision of a studio teacher while on the set.

United Kingdom
In the United Kingdom, a child actor is defined as someone under school leaving age. Before a child can work, they require a performance license from their Local Education Authority as well as a licensed chaperone; a parent can only chaperone their own child, and a chaperone's duties include acting in loco parentis and record arrival and departure time from the work place, the time a child is working, their breaks and the amount of tutoring. A child requires three hours minimum of tutoring daily and a lesson must be a minimum of 30 minutes to count towards the total and with regards to 16 and 17-year-old in further education, considerations are made in regards to their studies.

There are regulations and guidance to safeguard all actors under the age of 18; OFCOM guidance states a child's health and safety, well being and welfare is paramount in television production and factors such as their age, maturity and life experiences can affect their performance. OFCOM also advises that broadcasters undertake risk assessments, consider seeking expert advice and follow best practice.

Issues

Ownership of earnings
In the United States before the 1930s, many child actors never got to see the money they earned because they were not in charge of this money. Jackie Coogan earned millions of dollars from working as a child actor only to see most of it squandered by his parents. In 1939, California weighed in on this controversy and enacted the Coogan Bill, which requires a portion of the earnings of a child to be preserved in a special savings account called a blocked trust. A trust that is not actively monitored can also be problematic, however, as in the case of Gary Coleman, who after working from 1974, later sued his adoptive parents and former business advisor for $3.8 million over misappropriation of his trust fund.

Competitive pressure
Some people also criticize the parents of child actors for allowing their children to work, believing that more "normal" activities should be the staple during the childhood years.  Others observe that competition is present in all areas of a child's life—from sports to student newspaper to orchestra and band—and believe that the work ethic instilled or the talent developed accrues to the child's benefit.

The child actor may experience unique and negative pressures when working under tight production schedules.  Large projects which depend for their success on the ability of the child to deliver an effective performance add to the pressure.

Ethel Merman, who several times worked in long-running stage productions with child actors, disliked what she eventually saw as their over-professionalization—"acting more like midgets than children"—and disapproved of parents pushing adulthood on them.

After the childhood success 
 

There are many instances of troubled adult lives due to the stressful environment to which child actors are subjected. It is common to see a child actor grow up in front of the camera, whether in films, TV shows or both. However, it is not uncommon to see child actors continue their careers throughout as actors or in a different professional field.

Jodie Foster started acting at age 3, becoming the quintessential child actor during the 1970's with roles in films such as Tom Sawyer (1973), Alice Doesn't Live Here Anymore (1974), Taxi Driver (1976), Bugsy Malone (1976), The Little Girl Who Lives Down the Lane (1976), and Freaky Friday (1976). A child prodigy, Foster received her first Academy Award nomination at age 13 and later took a sabbatical from films to attend Yale University. She made a successful transition to adult roles, winning two Academy Awards for Best Actress before the age of 30, and starring in several successful and acclaimed films such as The Accused (1988), The Silence of the Lambs (1991), Nell (1994),  Maverick (1994), Contact (1997), and The Brave One (2007), thus establishing herself as one of the most accomplished and sought-after actresses of her generation. She has also ventured into directing and her directing credits include films such as Little Man Tate (1991), Money Monster (2016) and television shows such as House of Cards, Orange Is the New Black, and Black Mirror.

Now adults, Daniel Radcliffe, Rupert Grint and Emma Watson, the three leads of the acclaimed Harry Potter film series (2001–11), starred in every installment in the series, and have since continued to act in film, television, and theater in their early 30's.

Dakota Fanning rose to prominence after her breakthrough performance at age 7 in the film I Am Sam (2001). Her performance earned her a Screen Actors Guild Award nomination at age 8 in 2002, making her the youngest nominee in SAG history. She later appeared in major Hollywood productions, in such acclaimed blockbuster films as Man on Fire (2004), War of the Worlds (2005), Charlotte's Web (2006), Hounddog (2007), The Secret Life of Bees (2008), Coraline (2009), The Twilight Saga film series (2009–12), The Runaways (2010), and The Motel Life (2012). Fanning's younger sister, Elle Fanning also rose to prominence as a child actress, having appeared in many films since before she turned 3.

Miranda Cosgrove, known mainly for her role on Nickelodeon's Drake & Josh as a child, gained more attention for her role as a teenager in the show iCarly. Since the end of the show she has been featured in other roles, including as the voice of Margo in the Despicable Me franchise. Once she was of age, she decided to pursue a college degree in film at the University of Southern California.

Late actress Shirley Temple became a public figure and diplomat, beginning in the 1960's. Some of her duties included representing the United Nations, and becoming a U.S. ambassador in countries such as Ghana and Czechoslovakia.

Mary-Kate Olsen was treated for an eating disorder, deemed anorexia, but her twin sister remained less troubled. In an article with the magazine Marie Claire, Mary-Kate expressed the bittersweet nature of the twins' childhood. "I look at old photos of me, and I don't feel connected to them at all," she said. "I would never wish my upbringing on anyone... but I wouldn't take it back for the world." The twins now have continued success in the fashion industry with an estimated net worth of approximately $100 million dollars.

Drew Barrymore, a former child star, started acting at age 3. During her childhood she battled with drugs, but recovered and currently continues to act.

Natalie Portman took a small break in acting to get a bachelor's degree in Psychology from Harvard University before continuing her career as an actress.

Rider Strong, known as "Shawn Hunter" in Boy Meets World, was educated at Columbia University and now runs a successful blog and has published a graphic novel.

. Neil Patrick Harris started his career as a child actor in Doogie Howser, M.D. He continues to act in television, films and theater.  Harris is now a cult figure icon.

Jonathan Lipnicki, known mostly for the Stuart Little films, now successfully competes in Brazilian jiu-jitsu. Sara Gilbert is known for her role on Roseanne and later created and served as a co-host for CBS's The Talk. Also from Roseanne, Michael Fishman continued to work in film, but behind the scenes and has since been nominated for an Emmy for the work he did in Sports Science. Both Gilbert and Fishman returned for the later series based on Roseanne, The Conners, with Gilbert also serving as an executive producer and guiding the series through its transition after Roseanne Barr was fired after the tenth season of the revived Roseanne. Kirsten Dunst and Lacey Chabert both made the transition from a child actress to an adult actress with a rough patch including depression. After a stay in a rehabilitation center, Dunst was able to recover and continue her career. She proves that the pressures of growing up under the spotlight may not come without repercussions.

Roddy McDowall, who had a long and outstanding career including as the regular star of the Planet of the Apes series; Micky Dolenz, who started his career as a child star in the 1950s, grew up to be a musician of the successful 1960s pop group The Monkees, which had its own successful television show; Ron Howard, who, in addition to being the star of both of the long running The Andy Griffith Show and Happy Days television series, became an Academy Award-winning director in adulthood; Elijah Wood, who continued his career successfully into adulthood, starring as Frodo Baggins in The Lord of the Rings film series and starring as Ryan Newman in the television series Wilfred.

Other careers
Many actors and child actors careers are often quite short.   Many actors, out of personal choice, that start their careers as child actors decide not to pursue the same careers as adults. Shirley Temple, for example became a public figure and diplomat. Peter Ostrum, appearing in his only role, the lead character of Charlie Bucket in Willy Wonka and the Chocolate Factory became a large-scale veterinarian surgeon. While Jenny Lewis, formerly of film Troop Beverly Hills in 1989, is a well-known singer-songwriter indie rock musician.

In Poland, former child actors and identical twin brothers Lech and Jarosław Kaczyński became successful politicians, at one time Lech being President and Jarosław the Prime Minister.

See also
 Acting age
 List of child actors
Child labor

References

External links

 
 Mandy Kids  – a resource for child actors in the UK

 
Acting
Actor
Youth rights